MT2 Firing Range Services - Metals Treatment Technologies (MT2, LLC) is an American LLC, based in Arvada, Coloradom that provides  environmental firing range services, and lead remediation services.  Founded August 4, 2000 the company seeks to continue development, distribute, and deploy heavy metals treatment technologies for firing ranges and at contaminated sites.  The proprietary technology for those is implemented under the brand name ECOBOND.  MT2 is listed as a technology vendor on the EPA (Environmental Protection Agency) website for contaminated site Cleanup-Information, as well as the Interstate Technology and Regulatory Council's "Technical/Regulatory Guidelines, Characterization and Remediation of Soils at Closed Small Arms Firing Ranges."

Services

The services provided by MT2 include:
 Gun Range Lead cleaning services
 Lead reclamation & Brass recycle  
 Shooting 
 OSHA/EPA Consulting and Assessment
 Range Maintenance, HVAC systems support
 Range Construction and Renovation
 Lead Remediation & Abatement
 Firing Range Sustainability and Maintenance
 Firing Range Remediation and Closure
 Soil and Waste Stabilization/Treatment
 Brownfields/Land Development and Re-use
 Mine Remediation Services
 Lead-Based Paint - treatment/products for non-hazardous removal

Patented products
MT2, LLC distributes several versions of its product ECOBOND under the U.S. Patents: US 7314512 B2 and US 6984769 B2.  These patents cover the treatment of surfaces to stabilize heavy metals.  This includes a paint stripper additive, a paint that can support the non-hazardous removal of lead-based paint, and a QuickCoat paint that provides a latex barrier for non-removal purposes.

EcoBond
The metals treatment technology process used by MT2 includes chemical treatment processes for the remediation of heavy metals. This treatment is achieved via MT2's process under the brand name ECOBOND.  The product chemically changes the heavy metal, making it less leachable and subsequently substantially less hazardous to the environment and safer to work with.

Metals EcoBond treats include:
Arsenic,
Aluminum,
Antimony,
Barium,
Cadmium,
Chromium,
Lead,
Mercury,
Selenium,
several Radionuclides, and
Zinc.

Bullet shortages
Recent national bullet shortages have resulted in higher prices for consumers, and lower ammunition availability for the military.  This need has provided a significant market for MT2.  There is an estimated 15 years worth of lead bullets in the ground in American shooting ranges, waiting to be extracted.  In 2007 MT2 extracted 560,000 pounds of the heavy metal.

Firing ranges in the news
 Las Vegas Sun - Suburb to get the lead out of firing range
 Times Leader - Aiming to fix the ranges
 Marshall County Tribune - Getting the lead out
 AOL News - Bullet Makers 'Working Overtime' in US
 Denver Post - Bullet recycler gets lead out
 Pittsburgh Post-Gazette - Most state-run gun ranges closed till October for toxic lead removal
 Times Daily - Officers working around delivery delays, training issues
 The Washington Post - Maryland, River Group Settle Fight Over Creek

References

External links
 Official website
 ECOBOND Website

Arvada, Colorado
Articles containing video clips